Vinko Cvjetković (12 February 1911 – 9 September 1983) was a Croatian water polo player. He competed in the men's tournament at the 1936 Summer Olympics.

References

1911 births
1983 deaths
Croatian male water polo players
Olympic water polo players of Yugoslavia
Water polo players at the 1936 Summer Olympics
Sportspeople from Dubrovnik